Minato Oike (大池水杜, Ōike Minato, born 2 December 1996) is a Japanese BMX freestyle cyclist.

Oike competed at the 2020 Olympic Games where she came 7th in the women's BMX freestyle event.

See also
UCI Urban Cycling World Championships

References

1996 births
Living people
Sportspeople from Shizuoka Prefecture
Japanese female cyclists
BMX riders
Cyclists at the 2020 Summer Olympics
Olympic cyclists of Japan
20th-century Japanese women
21st-century Japanese women